The first time Elton John toured was in 1970 to support his second album Elton John. The first leg focused around the London area excluding the last two nights of the tour.

Elton, Nigel Olsson and Dee Murray then crossed over to North America where they were booked to play six nights at the Troubadour Club which proved Elton to be a success and brought him to the attention of the American public.

Elton's short residency at The Troubadour attracted several famous visitors including Elton's idol Leon Russell. Bob Dylan also visited Elton John and Bernie Taupin backstage before one of the performances. The first performance was introduced by Neil Diamond.

Following the success of the shows at The Troubadour Elton embarked on his first major tour of the United States starting on 29 October 1970 and ending on 4 December 1970. One show at the A&R Studios in New York City was recorded and later released as 17-11-70.

Tour dates

Setlist

References

External links

 Information Site with Tour Dates

Elton John concert tours
1970 concert tours